Tobias Hoesl (born 29 September 1961 in Munich, West Germany) is a German television actor.

Selected filmography
1984: , TV miniseries
1985: Morenga … Baron von Treskow
1985: The Feather Fairy … Jacob
1986: The Black Forest Clinic, TV series, 2 episodes … Robert Lösch
1986:  … Dr. Ed Barclay
1986: La Storia … Günther
1986: Una donna a Venezia, TV miniseries … Ricky
1987: The Old Fox: Der sanfte Tod, TV … Jens Gilbert
1987: The Old Fox: Die Abrechnung, TV … Peter Behrend
1987: , TV film
1987: Lockwood Desert, Nevada … Christian Land
1987: , TV film … Plavko
1988: Derrick: Eine Reihe von schönen Tagen, TV … Harald Kernbacher
1988: The Post Office Girl (L'Ivresse de la métamorphose), TV film … Thomas Grund
1988: Derrick: Mord inklusive, TV … Diener
1990: Dr. M … Achim
1990: Im Grunde meines Herzens bin ich Elektriker, TV film … Holger
1991: The Polar Bear King (Kvitebjørn kong Valemon) … King Valemon
1992: De terre et de sang, TV film … Ludwig
1992: Derrick: Ein merkwürdiger Privatdetektiv, TV … Ingo Görner
1993: , TV film … Paul Grandjean
1994: , TV miniseries … Dominic
1994: The Wanderer: Rebirth, TV … Anton
1995: Tatort: , TV … Rick Heiger
1995: ...dann hau ich eben ab, TV film … Christian Nossmann
1995: Il barone, TV miniseries … Philip Brian Sajeva Jr.
1995:  (Thirty-Something), TV series
1995: Ein Fall für zwei: Ein anständiger Mörder, TV
1995: , TV miniseries
1996: , TV miniseries … Yan Richter
1996: The Return of Sandokan (Il ritorno di Sandokan), TV miniseries … James Guilford
1997: Il goal del martin pescatore, TV film … Thomas 
1997: Derrick: Pornocchio, TV … Carlos Blecher
1998: , TV film … Spencer
1998: Eine fast perfekte Scheidung (An Almost Perfect Divorce) … Martin von Platt
1998: HeliCops: Sturzflug, TV … Christoph Eisfeld
1998: The Old Fox: Tod eines Freundes, TV … Walter Masch
1999: Klinik unter Palmen, TV series, 3 episodes … Ulf Wallin
1999: Der Bulle von Tölz: , TV … Dennis Rear
1999: Siska: Der Bräutigam der letzten Tage, TV … Matthias Koch 
2000: Aeon – Countdown im All, TV miniseries … Nick Meissner 
2000: Le ali della vita, TV miniseries … Dr. Vithold Heisler
2000: Für alle Fälle Stefanie: Herzensdieb, TV … Hardy Krenzler
2000: Inspector Rex: Death Via the Internet, TV … Klaus Kainz
2001: Der Fahnder: Mord perfekt, TV
2001: Küstenwache: Böser Schatten, TV … Mark Benning
2001: Medicopter 117: Die einzige Zeugin (The Only Witness), TV … Joachim Lehmann
2001: SOKO 5113: Ein mörderischer Fall, TV … Martin Böhme 
2002: Polizeiruf 110:  (Last Supper), TV … Sebastian Teichert
2002: , TV miniseries … Fritz
2003: Verliebte Diebe, TV film … Barkeeper
2003: In aller Freundschaft: Ein zweites Leben, TV … Hendrik Stein
2003: Kabinett (Cabinet), short film … Vico 
2004: Utta Danella: Der Mond im See (The Moon in the Lake), TV film … Harry Wilbert
2004: Leipzig Homicide: Der unsichtbare Tod, TV … Peter Sawatzki
2004: Our Charly: Flieg, Vogel, flieg, TV … Hajo Röwer
2005: Polizeiruf 110:  (Fatal Return), TV … Dr. Kortin
2006: Die Rosenheim-Cops: Die doppelte Venus, TV … Krishan Berg
2007: , TV film … Patrick Kaminsky
2007–2008: Der Arzt vom Wörthersee, TV series, 3 episodes … Peter Wallböck
2008: SOKO Wismar: Zerbrochenes Glas, TV … Magnus Norlin
2009: , TV film … Friedrich von Broich
2009: L'onore e il rispetto, TV series, 1 episode … Klaus Thorter
2009: , TV film … Klaus Grüber
2010: Meine wunderbare Familie: ...auf neuen Wegen, TV … Kurt Schiller
2011: SOKO Kitzbühel: Mordsgewinn, TV … Veit Bachmann
2012: Inga Lindström: Vier Frauen und die Liebe, TV film … Sondermann
2012–2013: Storm of Love, TV series, 9 episodes … Ari Fleischmann
2013: Die Rosenheim-Cops: Dabei sein ist alles, TV … Lars Wintrich
2016: Zoo Doctor: My Mom the Vet: Die Realistin, TV … Dr. Gregersen
2018: SOKO Wismar: Hafen der Ehe, TV … Michael Kamp

External links

Hoesl's profile at Agency Alexander, Munich 

1961 births
Living people
German male television actors
20th-century German male actors
Male actors from Munich
21st-century German male actors
German male film actors